The Harsimus Stem Embankment, also called Sixth Street Embankment, is a half-mile-long historic railroad embankment, now abandoned and largely overgrown with foliage, in the heart of the  historic downtown of Jersey City, New Jersey in the United States. The  embankment runs along the south side of Sixth Street west from Marin Boulevard to Brunswick Street. It is the border between the Harsimus and Hamilton Park neighborhoods. The overhead tracks of the beam bridge west of Brunswick Street were dismantled but the stone abutments remain.

This elevated stone structure once carried seven tracks of the Pennsylvania Railroad's Passaic and Harsimus Line to its freight yards and carfloat operations on the Hudson River at Harsimus Cove, and to its warehouse and distribution facility (now Harborside Financial Center). The line was part of the railroad's holdings on the waterfront, which included the Exchange Place passenger terminal and the Greenville Yard. The Embankment is listed on the New Jersey Register of Historic Places, is eligible for the National Register, and is a Jersey City municipal landmark.

In 2010, a local citizens' movement lobbied local governments, chiefly Hudson County and the city of Jersey City, to acquire the land and convert the embankment to a public park. The developer who owns the land where the embankment is located is opposed. In September 2010 a federal court ruled that sale to the developer was legal and that the city has previously not exercised its first option to buy the right-of-way from Conrail. The decision meant the city could claim the structure through eminent domain. A $1 million grant request was not honored.
The developer's proposals to sell portions of the land to the city were rejected in 2011. The case was brought to an appeals court, which found that the case against the developer could proceed. In January 2012 it was announced that a deal had been arranged whereby the city would purchase the property for $7 million. In September 2012 it was ruled that Conrail had not gone through the required process of "abandonment" and was not legally able to sell the property. Again in 2020, a deal was announced.

The city has agreed to allow for high-rise residential development along one block of the embankment.

See also

 Bergen Arches
 Bergen Hill
 Bloomingdale Trail
 Greenway, London
 Harsimus
 High Line
 Jersey City Branch
 Lowline
 Maidashi ryokuchi
 Promenade plantée
 Rail trail
 Rails-to-Trails Conservancy (RTC)
 Reading Viaduct

References

External links

 Harsimus Stem Embankment Preservation Coalition
 6th Street Embankment
 Conservation Resources Inc
 National Trust for Historic Preservation
 Appellate court brief regardin Conrail transfer
 Preservation chronology
 Surface Transportation Board filings
 Consolidated Rail Corporation-Abandonment Exemption-in Hudson County, NJ [STB Docket No. AB-167 (Sub-No. 1189X) 2009
 Hudson Newsmakers: Hyman opens up about fight over Jersey City embankment
 

Buildings and structures in Jersey City, New Jersey
History of Jersey City, New Jersey
Pennsylvania Railroad bridges
Rail infrastructure in New Jersey
Railroad bridges in New Jersey
Beam bridges in the United States
Viaducts in the United States
Transportation buildings and structures in Hudson County, New Jersey